Dragon Ultimate (1999) is a fantasy novel written by Christopher Rowley.

Plot introduction
The book is the seventh and final book in the Dragons of the Argonath series that follows the adventures of a human boy, Relkin, and his dragon, Bazil Broketail as they fight in the Argonath Legion’s 109th Marneri Dragons.

Plot summary

Picking up where the previous novel ended, Waakzaam the Great has attacked Ryetelth again, this time striking against the Sinni, the golden beings sometimes mistaken as the Ryetelth gods, who have been fighting against Waakzaam on the Sphereboard of Destiny from time immemorial. Waakzaam has taken control of an army of the Masters of Padmasa, who have been unable to reorganize themselves since the death of the Master Heruta Skash Gzug and has begun a full-scale invasion of the Argonath. To defeat the evil wizard, Relkin and Bazil must journey across time and space to battle a giant golem on the Sphereboard of Destiny. Once they accomplish this task, by taking control of giant constructs designed by the Sinni just for them, Waakzaam is finally defeated and oppressed peoples across the Sphereboard rise up in liberation. They then leave the Legions with Eilsa to finally begin their dream of owning their own land together.

References

1999 American novels
Novels by Christopher Rowley
American fantasy novels